David Anthony Harris  (born 1 November 1937) is a British former politician of the Conservative Party, who was a member of the House of Commons, the European Parliament, and the Greater London Council.

Political career
David Harris was a Conservative member of the Greater London Council from 1968 to 1977, representing Bromley until 1973 and then Ravensbourne. He first stood for Parliament at Mitcham and Morden in February 1974, but was beaten by Bruce Douglas-Mann of the Labour Party.

Harris was Member of Parliament (MP) for St Ives from 1983 until he retired in 1997, and also Member of the European Parliament (MEP) for Cornwall and Plymouth from 1979 to 1984.

Later life
Since retirement from politics in 1997, Harris has carried out several voluntary roles which have included chairman of the national Fishermen's Mission charity. He was appointed as an Officer of the Order of the British Empire (OBE) in the 2022 Birthday Honours for political and public service.

Harris lives in Perranwell Station, about six miles west of Truro in Cornwall.

References

Times Guide to the House of Commons Times Newspapers Limited, 1992

External links 

 

1937 births
Living people
Conservative Party (UK) MPs for English constituencies
Members of the Parliament of the United Kingdom for St Ives
UK MPs 1983–1987
UK MPs 1987–1992
UK MPs 1992–1997
Conservative Party (UK) MEPs
MEPs for England 1979–1984
Members of the Greater London Council
Officers of the Order of the British Empire